The Church of Our Lady of the Rosary and Saint Benedict is a Catholic church located in Cuiabá, the capital of the Brazilian state of Mato Grosso.

See also
Catholic Church in Brazil

References

Churches in Mato Grosso